The 2019–20 Siena Saints men's basketball team represented Siena College in the 2019–20 NCAA Division I men's basketball season. The Saints, led by first-year head coach Carmen Maciariello, played their home games at the Times Union Center in Albany, New York as members of the Metro Atlantic Athletic Conference. They finished the season 20–10 overall, 15–5 in MAAC play to finish in first place. As the #1 seed in the MAAC tournament, they defeated #9 seed Manhattan 63–49 in the quarterfinals. However, the semifinals and championship game, and all postseason tournaments, were cancelled amid the COVID-19 pandemic.

Previous season
The Saints finished the 2018–19 season 17–16 overall, 11–7 in MAAC play to finish in a four-way tie for second place. As the 5th seed in the 2019 MAAC tournament, they defeated No. 4 seed Rider in the quarterfinals 87–81, before falling to No. 1 seed Iona 57–73– in the semifinals.

On March 21, 2019, it was announced that head coach Jamion Christian would be accepting the head coaching position at George Washington. On March 25, it was announced that assistant coach Carmen Maciariello would be named as Christian's successor.

MAAC Championship and NCAA Berth 
Siena finished the regular season at 15–5 in conference play, good for first place and crowning the Saints as the 2019–20 MAAC regular season champion.

The Saints entered the conference tournament as the #1 seed on a 9-game winning streak and were heavy favorites to advance to the NCAA tournament. Manhattan coach Steve Masiello, went as far to reference the tournament as "The Siena Invitational". In their first game at the MAAC tournament, the Saints easily defeated #9 seed Manhattan 63–49. Just over 24 hours prior to their semifinal, the MAAC was forced to cancel the tournament due to the COVID-19 pandemic.

Roster

Schedule and results

|-
!colspan=12 style=| Regular season

|-
!colspan=12 style=| MAAC tournament
|-

|-

Source

References

Siena Saints men's basketball seasons
Siena Saints
Siena Saints men's basketball
Siena Saints men's basketball